A warbird is any vintage military aircraft now operated by civilian organizations and individuals, or in some instances, by historic arms of military forces, such as the Battle of Britain Memorial Flight, the RAAF Museum Historic Flight, or the South African Air Force Museum Historic Flight.

Naming

Although the term originally implied piston-driven aircraft from the World War II era, it is now often extended to include all airworthy former military aircraft, including jet-powered aircraft and helicopters.

The several different types of warbirds include the fighter, trainer, bomber, jet, transports, utility, etc. Examples of aircraft types include the North American P-51 Mustang, Vought F4U Corsair, Boeing B-17 Flying Fortress, North American T-6 Texan, Beechcraft T-34 Mentor, Messerschmitt Bf 109, Hawker Hurricane, and Supermarine Spitfire.

Sometimes, modern production aircraft such as Allison V-1710-powered Yakovlev Yak-9s from Yakovlev and replicas and reproductions of vintage aircraft are called "warbirds", such as Messerschmitt Me 262s built by the Me 262 Project and Focke-Wulf Fw 190s by Flug + Werk; this can include any one of a large number of different aircraft designs from between World War I and the late 1930s, when military aircraft design was less complex.  Such replicated warbirds may even be powered by vintage engines from the era of the aircraft design being flown, as Cole Palen and others associated with his institution did at Palen's Old Rhinebeck Aerodrome aviation museum with accurate and airworthy reproductions of the Fokker Dr.I, Fokker D.VII, Fokker D.VIII, Sopwith Camel, and Sopwith Dolphin World War I aircraft.

Major operators of historic aircraft
 Alpine Fighter Collection of New Zealand Fighter Pilots Museum
 Amicale Jean-Baptiste Salis

 Battle of Britain Memorial Flight
 Canadian Warplane Heritage Museum
 Historical Aviation Restoration Society
 Shuttleworth Collection

 Royal Australian Air Force No. 100 Squadron
 Temora Historic Flight (Temora Aviation Museum)

 The Fighter Collection
 In the United States:
 Army Aviation Heritage Foundation
 Berlin Airlift Historical Foundation
 Collings Foundation
 Commemorative Air Force
 EAA Aviation Museum
 Fantasy of Flight
 Lone Star Flight Museum
 Military Aviation Museum
 Old Rhinebeck Aerodrome
 Planes of Fame Museum
 Yankee Air Force

Restoration process
Vintage warbird restoration, or classic aircraft restoration, is the process of taking aircraft from the previous era, and performing processes such as maintenance, repairs, and refurbishments to restore the aircraft to its original military configuration (minus any working weaponry). According to Classic Warplanes, some of the tasks performed on these vintage aircraft include:
 Structural repairs
 Standard maintenance
 Interior and exterior paint
 Decals and stamps
 Upholstery replacements
 Control heads and radios
 Parachutes, ejection seats, and ejection seat cartridges
 Rewiring
 Replacement of real weaponry with nonoperating replicas

Airshows

Restored warbirds are a frequent attraction at airshows. Airshows are held all over the world annually. Warbird Alley claims that some of the best-known airshows that feature warbirds are:
 Alliance Airshow – Fort Worth, Texas
 Commemorative Air Force AIRSHO – Midland, Texas
 Dayton Airshow – Dayton, Ohio
 EAA AirVenture Oshkosh – Oshkosh, Wisconsin
 History of Flight Airshow – Geneseo, New York
 Indianapolis Airshow – Indianapolis, Indiana
 Miramar Airshow – Miramar, California
 Sun 'n Fun – Lakeland, Florida
 Warbirds over the Beach – Virginia Beach, Virginia
 Warbirds over Monroe – Monroe, North Carolina
 Warbirds over Wanaka – Wanaka, Otago

In Europe, one of the best-known warbird airshows is the annual Flying Legends arranged in Imperial War Museum Duxford in UK. La Ferté-Alais air show in France collects warbirds annually, too. Warbirds fly also in most of the Shuttleworth Collection flying days in UK every summer.

In Australia a biennial event, Warbirds Downunder, is held at the Temora Aviation Museum in Temora, NSW "for a two-day celebration of Australian aviation history". The event features warbirds from private and museum collections around the country (such as the HARS collection), both in flying and static displays, as well as being regularly supported by current squadrons of the Royal Australian Air Force, including No. 100 Squadron and the RAAF formation aerobatic display team, the Roulettes.

Air racing 
Highly modified and "stock" warbirds can also frequently be seen at air races, since World War II-era fighters are among the fastest propeller-driven airplanes ever built. 

The premier event for warbird air racing is the Reno Air Races, held each September near Reno, Nevada. There are several classes of racing that facilitate the application of warbirds in the sport, including the:

 Jet Class
 T-6 Class
 Unlimited Class

Some of the most popular warbirds for racing are the North American P-51 Mustang, the Hawker Sea Fury, the Grumman F8F Bearcat, and the North American T-6 Texan.

In more recent years, straight wing, jet-powered warbirds such as the Aero L-29 Delfin, Aero L-39 Albatros, BAC Jet Provost, De Havilland Vampire, and PZL TS-11 Iskra have seen the conception of their own racing class, known simply as the Jet Class.

Clubs and organizations

Some organizations in the United States are:
Experimental Aircraft Association (EAA): The primary focus of the group started with building individual airplanes, and it soon grew to include antiques, classics, warbirds, aerobatic aircraft, ultralights, helicopters, and contemporary manufactured aircraft.
Warbirds of America is a nonprofit organization formed in 1964. A year after its start, it became a branch of the EAA.
Classic Jet Aircraft Association
Commemorative Air Force

See also
 Antique aircraft
 Aviation archaeology
 Aviation museum
 :Category:Lists of surviving aircraft

References

Further reading

External links

 Australian Warbirds Association
 Berlin Airlift Historical Foundation
 Classic Jet Aircraft Association
 Commemorative Air Force
 Experimental Aircraft Association
 EAA AirVenture
 EAA Warbirds of America.
 New Zealand Warbirds
 Temora Aviation Museum
 The Fighter Collection
 Shuttleworth Collection
 Warbirds Downunder

Military aircraft
Militaria